Le Bodéo (Gallo: Le Bodéo) is a commune in the Côtes-d'Armor department of Brittany in north-western France.

Population

Inhabitants of Le Bodéo are called Bodéosiens in French.

See also
Communes of the Côtes-d'Armor department

References

Communes of Côtes-d'Armor